The tables below present a view of the decommissioned ships of the Colombian Navy. 

The Colombian Navy was first formed in 1810 during the war of independence, exiled during the Spanish reconquest in 1815 and returned in 1819 during the successful rebellion of Simon Bolivar. Many major units were lost in 1830 on the separation of Venezuela and Ecuador, including her frigates and corvettes. In 1843 the navy was ordered to be suppressed,  what ships remained came under the command of the army until 1860-67 when a formal navy returned during and after the 1860-62 Colombian Civil War. In 1867 the navy was decreed to be sold again, standing naval forces consisting only of the coastguard and steamers for interior work, with armies of both sides expropriating or seizing ships during the numerous civil wars of 1860, 1876, 1885, and 1895. The few ships that were bought were quickly sold after conflict had ended and contract steamers were operated for short periods sometimes by individual states. The navy was reformed around the cruiser Cordoba acquired in 1896 and had a major role in the 1899-1902 civil war. With the last of the cruisers sold in 1916 the navy reverted to a coastguard and river service until it saw a rapid expansion for the 1932-33 Peru-Colombia War.

Cruisers 

 

These vessels were all rated as crucero in Colombian government records, but with the exception of Cartagena are often given as gunboats in European records.

Gunboats

Armed & Government Steamers

Contract & Impressed Steamers 
 
 
These vessels were not owned by the Colombian government, but were contract steamers, expropriated by government, or seized or acquired by revolutionary forces during the numerous Colombian civil wars of the mid and late 19th century.

Oceanic combat

Coast Guard

Training, Auxiliary & Logistics

Notes

References 

 

Ships of the Colombian Navy
Naval ships of Colombia